Raily Ignacio (born 4 June 1987) is a Curaçaoan international footballer, who currently plays as a striker for AFC in the Dutch Tweede Divisie.

Career
He played previously for ADO Den Haag in the Dutch Eredivisie and joined in summer 2011 to SV Spakenburg.

International career
Ignacio was a Curaçaoan substitute in two 2014 FIFA World Cup qualification (CONCACAF) qualifier matches against Antigua and Barbuda on September 2 and September 6 against Haiti.

Notes

Dutch footballers
Dutch people of Curaçao descent
1987 births
Living people
Curaçao footballers
Curaçao international footballers
ADO Den Haag players
FC Dordrecht players
SV Spakenburg players
Rijnsburgse Boys players
Kozakken Boys players
Amsterdamsche FC players
Eredivisie players
Eerste Divisie players
Tweede Divisie players
Derde Divisie players
Footballers from The Hague
Association football forwards